Du Liniang is a fictional character from Tang Xianzu's play The Peony Pavilion. "Du" is her surname; "Li" means "beautiful", and "Niang", "young lady". Only sixteen years old, she encounters a dream lover, Liu Mengmei, when she falls asleep in a long-abandoned garden. Overcome by lovesickness, she wastes away and dies, only to be brought back to life. She haunts Liu Mengmei, who now lives in the garden, until he promises to exhume her. She is resurrected and joined in marriage with Liu.  
Today, Du Liniang is most often seen on the Kunqu stage, where her role is the best-loved of the Guimen Dan role types. Famous interpreters of the role have included Mei Lanfang, Zhang Jiqing, and Jennifer Hua Wenyi.

Characters in Chinese opera